Chrysler's Multi-Displacement System (MDS) is an automobile engine variable displacement technology. It debuted in 2006 on the 5.7 L modern Hemi V8. Like Mercedes-Benz's Active Cylinder Control, General Motors' Active Fuel Management, and Honda's Variable Cylinder Management, it deactivates four of the V8's cylinders when the throttle is closed or at steady speeds.

The system was first offered only on passenger cars, since the heavy demands of trucks would interfere with its operation. However, it was recalibrated for 2006 and was offered on all seven models, including SUVs and 1500 series trucks, using the 5.7 L engine.

Chrysler expected that the technology would boost economy by 10% to 20%. In the Jeep Grand Cherokee with MDS, highway fuel mileage for the V8 is the same as the V6 at 21 mpg (11.2 liters per 100 km).

In order to preserve the characteristic rumble of the V8 engines, Chrysler and Eberspaecher North America designed a special exhaust system for MDS-equipped vehicles. This includes four separate mufflers, two large central ones for V8 mode and two smaller ones near the tailpipes for four-cylinder mode. Unlike the system used on Mercedes-Benz V12 engines, also designed by Eberspaecher, the system is mechanically passive.

Applications:
 2005– Chrysler 300C
 2006– Dodge Charger
 2005– Dodge Magnum
 2005– Jeep Grand Cherokee
 2006– Dodge Durango
 2006– Dodge Ram (1500 only)
 2006– Jeep Commander
 2007– Chrysler Aspen
 2009– Dodge Challenger

See also
 Daimler AG's Active Cylinder Control (ACC)
 Displacement on Demand
 General Motors' Active Fuel Management (AFM)
 Honda's Variable Cylinder Management (VCM) 
 Variable displacement

External links
 "Give Deactivation its Due" – Ward's Auto World via archive.org
 "Twice-Tuned Hemi" – Ward's Auto World via archive.org

Chrysler
Engine technology